There are over 20,000 Grade II* listed buildings in England. This page is a list of these buildings in the district of Tonbridge and Malling in Kent.

Tonbridge and Malling

|}

Notes

External links

Lists of Grade II* listed buildings in Kent
Grade II* listed buildings in Kent
Tonbridge and Malling